Case Anton was the military occupation of France carried out by Germany and Italy in November 1942. It marked the end of the Vichy regime as a nominally-independent state and the disbanding of its army (the severely-limited Armistice Army), but it continued its existence as a puppet government in Occupied France. One of the last actions of the Vichy armed forces before their dissolution was the scuttling of the French fleet in Toulon to prevent it from falling into Axis hands.

Background 
A German plan to occupy Vichy France had been drawn up in December 1940 under the codename of Operation Attila and soon came to be considered with Operation Camellia, the plan to occupy Corsica. Operation Anton updated the original Operation Attila, including different German units and adding Italian involvement.

For Adolf Hitler, the main rationale for permitting a nominally-independent France to exist was that it was, in the absence of German naval superiority, the only practical means to deny the use of the French colonies to the Allies. However, the Allied landings in French North Africa on 8 November 1942 caused that rationale to disappear, especially since it quickly became apparent that the Vichy government possessed neither the political will nor the practical means to prevent French colonial authorities from submitting to Allied occupation. Moreover, Hitler knew he could not risk an exposed flank on the French Mediterranean. After a final conversation with French Prime Minister Pierre Laval, Hitler gave orders for Corsica to be occupied on 11 November and Vichy France the following day.

Operation 

By the evening of 10 November 1942, Axis forces had completed their preparations for Case Anton. The 1st Army advanced from the Atlantic coast, parallel to the Spanish border, while the 7th Army advanced from central France towards Vichy and Toulon, under the command of General Johannes Blaskowitz. The Italian 4th Army occupied the French Riviera and an Italian division landed on Corsica. By the evening of 11 November, German tanks had reached the Mediterranean coast.

The Germans had planned Operation Lila to capture intact the demobilised French fleet at Toulon. French naval commanders managed to delay the Germans by negotiation and subterfuge long enough to scuttle their ships on 27 November, before the Germans could seize them, preventing three battleships, seven cruisers, 28 destroyers and 20 submarines from falling into the hands of the Axis powers. Despite the disappointment of the German Naval War Staff, Hitler considered that the elimination of the French fleet sealed the success of Operation Anton since the destruction of the fleet denied it to Charles de Gaulle and the Free French Navy.

Vichy France limited its resistance to radio broadcasts objecting to the violation of the armistice of 1940. The German government countered that it was the French who violated the armistice first by not offering a determined resistance to the Allied landings in North Africa. The 50,000-strong Vichy French Army took defensive positions around Toulon, but when confronted by German demands to disband, it did so since it lacked the military capability to resist the Axis forces.

Aftermath 

Although it became little more than a puppet government, the Vichy regime continued to exercise nominal civil authority over the whole of Metropolitan France except Alsace-Lorraine, as it had done since 1940. The Italian occupation zone was abolished following the removal of Mussolini from office and the Italian government's subsequent request for an armistice in 1943. France subsequently remained under exclusively German occupation from then until the Allied invasion and liberation of the country in 1944.

See also 
 German occupation of France during World War II
 Italian occupation of France during World War II

Footnotes

References 

 
 
  

1942 in France
1942 in military history
Anton
World War II operations of the Western European Theatre
Anton
November 1942 events
Axis powers